Orenburg ), formerly known as Chkalov (1938–1957), is the administrative center of Orenburg Oblast, Russia. Orenburg is also very close to the border with Kazakhstan.

Name

Several historians have tried to explain the origins of the city's name. It was traditionally accepted that the word "orenburg" means a fortress on the River Or. In 1734, in accordance with his project, a package of governmental documents was worked out. This was the starting point for Orenburg as a fortress city near the meeting of the Or and Ural rivers.

On 7 June 1734, "A Privilege for Orenburg" (tsar's edict) was ordered by Empress Anna Ioannovna. While the construction site of the main fortress changed many times (down the River Ural), the name "Orenburg" has not changed since its founding in 1743. Between 1938 and 1957, the city was referred to as Chkalov, named after the famous Soviet pilot Valery Chkalov, although he was not born in and never lived in Orenburg, and never visited Orenburg. In 1954, Chkalov's five-meter bronze sculpture was erected on the occasion of his 50th birth anniversary; this was installed on a seven-meter pedestal on the Boulevard (the riverside promenade of the city, commonly named "Belovka").

Orenburg was unofficially called the Asian capital of Russia.

History

In 1734, the Russian Empire began expanding its control and influence in Asia starting from the construction of the fortress city called "Orenburg" on its eastern border (in Southern Ural). For this purpose, a settlement was founded here in 1735—at the place where the Or and the Ural rivers join. The initial site was chosen for settlement during the expedition of I.K. Kirilov, who initiated developmental activities in the region. He argued that the city was necessary "...for opening up transit routes to Bukhara, Badakhshan, Bulk, and to India", making it possible to receive "wealth from there—gold, lapis lazuli, and garnet." After his death, a new administrator of the Orenburg expedition, Vasily Tatishchev, was appointed. He did not consider this place to be convenient for construction of the city, because it was constantly flooded by the spring high waters. This encouraged to launch in 1739 preparations for building a new town with the old name downstream the river Ural (Yaik) on the mountain Krasnaya (Red). The old settlement was named the Orsk fortress (now the city of Orsk).

On 6 August 1741, the new town was founded. However, its construction did not start. The location on the Krasnaya mountain—treeless, rocky and remote from the river—was also inappropriate for building the town. A new administrator of the Orenburg expedition, Ivan Neplyuyev, was appointed. On 19 (30) April 1743, Orenburg was founded for a third time, on the compound that was once the Berda fortress,  from the Krasnogorsk mountain area. In the summer of 1742, Neplyuev personally chose a new place surrounded by forests and crop fields, where the Yaik and the Sakmara rivers meet. Now it is the historical centre of the city. The city built upon the mountain Krasnaya was named Krasnogorsk. This third Orenburg functioned as an important military outpost on the border with the nomadic Kazakhs. It became the centre of the Orenburg Cossacks.

Orenburg played a major role in Pugachev's Rebellion (1773–1774), the largest peasant revolt in Russian history. At the time, it was the capital of a vast district and the seat of the governor. Yemelyan Pugachev besieged the city and its fortress from nearby Berda from October 1773 to March 26, 1774. The defense was organized by Governor of Orenburg lieutenant-general  Reinsdorf.
General Golytsin defeated Pugachev at Berda, and later again at Kargala (north of Orenburg). Most of the city was left in ruins, and thousands of inhabitants had died in the siege. Government forces crushed revolt towards the end of 1774 by General Michelsohn at Tsaritsyn. Further reprisals against rebel areas were carried out by General Peter Panin.

Alexander Pushkin visited Orenburg in 1833 during a research trip for his books The History of Pugachev and his famous novel The Captain's Daughter. He met his friend Vladimir Dal here, who would later write the first serious dictionary of the Russian language.

Orenburg was the base for General Perovsky's expeditions against the Khanate of Khiva in the 1830s through 1850s.  After the incorporation of Central Asia into the Russian Empire, Orenburg became a trading station and, since the completion of the Trans-Aral Railway, a prominent railway junction en route to the new Central Asian possessions and to Siberia.

Orenburg functioned as the capital of the Kirghiz Autonomous Soviet Socialist Republic (in present-day Kazakhstan) within Russia from 1920–1925. When that republic was renamed Kazakh Autonomous Socialist Soviet Republic in 1925, Orenburg joined Russia and Kyzylorda became the new capital. Almaty became the capital in 1929 after the construction of the Turkestan–Siberia Railway. Kazakh Autonomous Soviet Socialist Republic was promoted to union republic status as the Kazakh Soviet Socialist Republic Kazakh SSR in 1936. Orenburg remained in Russia. From 1938 to 1957, the city bore the name Chkalov (after the prominent test pilot Valery Chkalov). The city's distance from the German invasion during World War II led many Soviet enterprises to flee there, helping to spur the city's economic growth.

Administrative and municipal status
Orenburg is the administrative center of the oblast and, within the framework of administrative divisions, it also serves as the administrative centre of Orenburgsky District, even though it is not a part of it. As an administrative division, it is, together with ten rural localities, incorporated separately as the City of Orenburg—an administrative unit with the status equal to that of the districts. As a municipal division, the City of Orenburg is incorporated as Orenburg Urban Okrug.

Geography
The city is in the basin of the middle branch of the River Ural, near its confluence with the River Sakmara.

Economy
Orenburg is home to several large companies or their subsidiaries: Orenburggazprom, the subsidiary of Gazprom; Orenburgneft, the subsidiary of TNK-BP oil company; Orenburgenergy, one of the biggest energy generating companies in Russia.

Transportation
Orenburg has been a major railway centre ever since the Samara-Zlatoust and Orenburg-Tashkent railroads were completed, respectively in 1876 and 1905. City public transport includes bus, trolleybus and also marshrutkas (fixed-route cabs).

Climate

Orenburg has a relatively dry humid continental climate (Köppen climate classification Dfa) with quite long and hot summers and long and cold winters. April and October are transition months, with the rest of the months being either summer or winter.

Education and culture
Orenburg is a regional centre of education and has a number of cultural institutions and museums.

Education

 Orenburg State University. The university was founded in 1955 as a branch of Kuibyshev Polytechnic Institute.In 1971, it converted into Orenburg Polytechnic Institute. In 1994, it became Orenburg State Technical University. In 1996, converted into Orenburg State University.In 2014, Orenburg State Institute of Management integrated with Orenburg State University.

 Orenburg State Medical Academy. Established in 1944 as Chkalov State Medical Institute. It was renamed to Orenburg State Medical Institute in 1957 (at that time Orenburg city regained its original name after being named Chkalov from 1937 till 1957). It gained the status of academy in 1994. Currently there are eight faculties: Medicine, Pediatric, Stomatology (Dentistry), Pharmacy, Clinical Psychology, Nursing, Public Health (Медико-профилактический), and Continuing Education.
 Orenburg State Agrarian University. Established in 1930 as Orenburg Agricultural Institute. It was transformed to Orenburg State Agricultural Academy in 1992. Since 1995 named as Orenburg State Agrarian University. There are 8 faculties and four institutes.
 Orenburg State Pedagogical University. Established in 1919 as Institute of Public Education. Renamed to Pedagogical Institute in 1930. Transformed to Pedagogical University in 1996. There are 10 faculties and four research institutes.
 Orenburg Branch of Kutafin Moscow State Law University
 Orenburg Branch of Gubkin Russian State University of Oil and Gas
 Physics and Mathematics Lyceum

Museums
Orenburg Regional Museum of History and Natural Science
Orenburg Regional Museum of Fine Arts
Museum of Orenburg History
Memorial Apartment of Yuri and Valentina Gagarin
Memorial Apartment of Leopold and Mstislav Rostropovich
Memorial Apartment of T.G. Shevchenko
Orenburg City Memorial House

Theatres
Orenburg Maxim Gorky State Drama Theater 
Orenburg State Regional Music Theater 
Orenburg State Tatar Drama Theater
Orenburg State Regional Puppet Theater
Orenburg Municipal Puppet Theater "Pierrot"
Orenburg Municipal Chamber Choir
Orenburg State Academic Russian Folk Choir

Mosques
Orenburg Caravanserai

Tourism

Mountain and river tourism are developed in the region. There are a number of fast mountain rivers and rocks in pleated spurs of the southern edge of the Urals range, popular with tourists.
The city is known for its location between Europe and Asia. The Ural River marks the border of Asia and Europe, and there is a bridge which connects the two sides.

The city is famous for its down Orenburg shawls.  The thinnest lacy design, knitted by hand shawls and cobweb-like kerchiefs (pautinkas), is not only warm, but also is used for decorative purposes.

Architecture
See also Orenburg architecture gallery on Russian Wikipedia

A famous boulevard on the embankment of the Ural River is one of the most notable places in Orenburg. Orenburg TV Tower is a guyed mast of unusual design.

Sports
FC Orenburg, the local football team founded in 1970, reached the Russian Premier League for the first time during the 2016-17 season.
Lokomotiv has played in the highest division of the Russian Bandy League. Now they play in the second highest division, Russian Bandy Supreme League. Their home arena has a capacity of 5000.
Nadezhda Orenburg is a women's basketball club competing in the Russian Women's Basketball Premier League and playing in the Orenburzhe Sports Hall.
Fakel Gazproma is a table tennis club with, among other players, the three time European champion Uładzimir Samsonaŭ.

National events
In October 2015, the Russian Rink Bandy Cup was to be organised.

Honors
The asteroid 27709 Orenburg was named after the city on June 1, 2007.

Notable people
 Ivan Krylov (1769–1844), writer
 Vasily Alekseevich Perovsky (1794—1857), statesman
 Vladimir Dal (1801–1872), lexicographer
 Yevgraf Fyodorov (1853–1919), mathematician, crystallographer, and mineralogist
 Paul Nazaroff (1890–1942), geologist and writer
 Joseph Kessel (1898–1979), journalist and novelist
 Georgy Malenkov (1901–1988), General Secretary of the Communist Party of the Soviet Union (de facto,1952-1953) and 5thPremier of the Soviet Union
 Musa Cälil (1906–1944), poet
 Alexander Schmorell (1917–1943), a member of the anti-Nazi group White Rose
 Aleksander Burba (1918–1984), industry leader and educator
 Mstislav Rostropovich (1927–2007), cellist
 Yuri Gagarin (1934–1968), cosmonaut
 Denis Istomin (born 1986), tennis player
 Alexander Alexandrovich Prokhorenko (1990-2016), a Senior lieutenant with the Special Operations Forces of the Russian Armed Forces. He was killed during the Palmyra offensive of the Syrian Civil War. Prokhorenko was identifying targets for Russian airstrikes when he was surrounded by ISIS fighters near Palmyra and ordered an airstrike on his own location

Twin towns – sister cities

Orenburg is twinned with:
 Aktobe, Kazakhstan
 Khujand, Tajikistan
 Oral, Kazakhstan
 Orlando, United States

References

Notes

Sources

External links

 
Official website of Orenburg 
Orenburg State Institute of Management
Photos of Orenburg 

 
Orenburgsky Uyezd
Populated places established in 1743
History of Ural
1743 establishments in the Russian Empire
Transcontinental cities